Eugenia Bokoka Mosua (born 3 June 2000), sportingly known as Anaís, is an Equatoguinean footballer who plays as a forward for Malabo Kings FC and the Equatorial Guinea women's national team.

International career
Bokoka made her senior debut for Equatorial Guinea on 27 November 2017. She also represented the country at under-20 level at the 2019 African Games.

International goals
Scores and results list Equatorial Guinea's goal tally first

References

External links

2000 births
Living people
Sportspeople from Malabo
Equatoguinean women's footballers
Women's association football forwards
Equatorial Guinea women's international footballers
Competitors at the 2019 African Games
African Games competitors for Equatorial Guinea